Mathieu Boots (born 23 June 1975 in Venhuizen) is a Dutch retired football player.

Club career
A relative late newcomer, Boots made his professional debut for Volendam in an August 2000 Eerste Divisie match against VVV. He moved abroad a year later to play for Belgian side KV Mechelen with whom he won promotion to the Eerste Klasse but got relegated after one season in the top flight.

Boots then spent two seasons in the J2 League with Yokohama FC, only to return to Volendam in 2004. He retired from professional football in 2010.

He returned to his former club Hollandia to play amateur football in the Topklasse. In 2013, he left Hollandia for lower league side De Valken, where he started playing football as a child.

Club statistics

After football
After retiring as a player, Boots became an accountant.

References

External links

J. League
J. League

1975 births
Living people
People from Venhuizen
Association football defenders
Dutch footballers
FC Volendam players
K.V. Mechelen players
Yokohama FC players
Eerste Divisie players
J2 League players
Derde Divisie players
Dutch expatriate footballers
Expatriate footballers in Belgium
Dutch expatriate sportspeople in Belgium
Expatriate footballers in Japan
Dutch expatriate sportspeople in Japan
HVV Hollandia players
Footballers from North Holland